Joseph Travis Rosser (J. Travis Rosser, J. Traverse Rosser) was an American politician.

From Mankato, Minnesota, Rosser served as the Secretary of the Minnesota Territory from 1853 to 1857. Rosser was from Virginia, a lawyer, and slaveholder. He was also a delegate to the Democratic National Convention of 1860 from Minnesota.

Notes

Year of birth unknown
Year of death unknown
Politicians from Mankato, Minnesota
People from Virginia
Minnesota lawyers
Minnesota Democrats
Minnesota Territory officials